Natural History is a natural history magazine published in the United States. The stated mission of the magazine is to promote public understanding and appreciation of nature and science.

History 
Founded in 1900 by the American Museum of Natural History, Natural History was first titled The American Museum Journal. In 2002, the magazine was purchased from the Museum by a new company, headed at the time by Charles Harris. As of 2013 the magazine is published in North Carolina by Howard Richman.   There are 10 issues published annually.

Since its founding, Natural History has chronicled the major expeditions and research findings by curators at the American Museum of Natural History and at other natural history museums and science centers. Stephen Jay Gould's column, "This View of Life," was a regular feature of the magazine from 1974 until he retired the column in 2001. Other regular columnists and contributing authors include Neil deGrasse Tyson, Jared Diamond, Richard Dawkins, Norman D. Newell, and Thomas Nicholson.

References

External links

 
 Online archives
 
     

History magazines published in the United States
Magazines established in 1900
Environmental magazines
Nature magazines
Science and technology magazines published in the United States
American Museum of Natural History
Magazines published in North Carolina